Renato Hipólito Castro Reis  (born 16 November 1990 in Aguiar ) is a Portuguese footballer who plays for Sporting Covilhã on loan from C.D. Aves, as a forward.

External links 
 
 

1990 births
Living people
Portuguese footballers
Association football forwards
C.D. Aves players